The  is a specially constructed 387-meter canal in Kikuyō, Kumamoto, Japan, which lets water flow into the downstream without depositing the mixed ash. The Aso area from which water flows is rich in such ash, volcanic in nature. This structure was credited to Katō Kiyomasa who had it constructed it in the early 1600s.

Etymology
"Hanaguri" is the Japanese word for an ox's muzzle-ring. The Hanaguri Ide looks like such a ring.

It is also called Karakawano Tsuzuraore.

Structure
 (1562 - 1611) was a daimyō who entered Kumamoto in 1588. He was known not only as a samurai but also as a castle builder and as one who controlled　rivers. He designed a 113-meter-wide dam to control the flow of Shirakawa River, at Babagusu village, followed by a 1,638-meter canal and a 387-meter special canal called Hanaguri Ide.  The rock bed had 2-meter-wide tunnels, interconnected and situated alternately at different heights, so that the entering water would crash violently and come in contact with the surfaces of each tunnel, and ash would whirl down the downstream.

There were officials who did not understand the structure, and destroyed 52 holes. However, with 28 holes remaining, Hanaguri Ide worked well. The Hanaguri Ide enriched wide areas good for rice fields, so that tax revenues tripled after the construction of Hanaguri Ide.

Improvements in agriculture

A number of rice fields were developed due to Hanaguri Ide:
Nuyamazu Tenaga area: about 21 chō (1 chō is 2.451 acres)
Ozu Tenaga area:about 33 chō
Honjo Tenaga area:about 23 chō

The period of construction
It was assumed to be between 1600 and 1611 based on the personal history of Katō Kiyomasa who governed the Higo country. There was a reference that the dam was constructed in 1608.

Floods 
Hanaguri Ide experienced two big floods; one in July, 1796 and another on June 26, 1953 or 1953 North Kyushu Flood. Especially the latter flood contained volcanic ash due to the eruption of Mount Aso, Kumamoto Prefecture. There was a monument after the reconstruction of the dam as follows.

The Monument

References

Sources
Yoneo Yano, Kato Kiyomasa, River control 1991, Shimizu Kobundo, 
Shizuo Honda, River control facilities for agriculture in Kumamoto han, 1970, Kumamoto Prefecture Land Improvement Associations. p. 173
Katō Kiyomasa Construction Summarizing Committee, Katō Kiyomasa, how he made towns and river improvements. 1995, Ministry of Construction, Kumamoto Branch, p. 43-44

External links
Hanaguri Ide, with photographs retrieved on Oct. 31, 2012
Hanaguri Ide with explanation and photographs Retrieved on Oct. 31
Kikuyo Town Website Retrieved on Oct. 31
The structure of Hanaguri Ide and application to water lanes Retrieved on Oct. 31

Irrigation
Kumamoto Prefecture